Rothschild's woolly rat (Mallomys rothschildi) is a species of rodent in the family Muridae. It is found on the island of New Guinea: both in the West Papua region of Indonesia and Papua New Guinea.

The species has been known to eat karuka nuts (Pandanus julianettii), and growers will put platforms or other obstacles on the trunks of the trees to keep the pests out.

Names
It is known as mosak, aloñ, kabkal, or maklek in the Kalam language of Papua New Guinea.

References

Mallomys
Rodents of Papua New Guinea
Mammals of Western New Guinea
Rodents of Indonesia
Mammals described in 1898
Taxonomy articles created by Polbot
Taxa named by Oldfield Thomas
Rodents of New Guinea